Kinyongia (derived from the group's name in Kiswahili language) is a chameleon genus recently  established for several plesiomorphic species found in forest and woodland in Kenya, Tanzania, Uganda, Rwanda, and far eastern DR Congo. All except K. adolfifriderici and K. tavetana are restricted to highlands, and many have very small geographic ranges. In most, at least the males have horns or knobs on their noses. They had been placed into the genus Bradypodion for some time.  It has recently been pointed out that the ending to the specific epithet in several of the below listed species should be modified to match the feminine genus name.

Species
The following 23 species are recognized as being valid.

Kinyongia adolfifriderici  – Ituri chameleon
Kinyongia asheorum – Mount Nyiro bearded chameleon
Kinyongia boehmei  –  Boehme's chameleon
Kinyongia carpenteri  – Carpenter's chameleon
Kinyongia excubitor  – Mt. Kenya hornless chameleon
Kinyongia fischeri  – Fischer's chameleon, Nguru blade-horned chameleon, Nguru two-horned chameleon
Kinyongia gyrolepis – Lendu chameleon
Kinyongia itombwensis  – Itombwe forest chameleon
Kinyongia magomberae  – Magombera chameleon
Kinyongia matschiei  – giant monkey-tailed East Usambara two-horned chameleon
Kinyongia msuyae 
Kinyongia multituberculata  – West Usambara two-horned chameleon
Kinyongia mulyai 
Kinyongia oxyrhina  – sharp-nosed chameleon
Kinyongia rugegensis  – Rugege highlands forest chameleon
Kinyongia tavetana  – dwarf Fischer's chameleon, dwarf two-horned chameleon
Kinyongia tenuis  – Usambara soft-horned chameleon
Kinyongia tolleyae  – Tolley's forest chameleon
Kinyongia uluguruensis  – Uluguru two-horned chameleon
Kinyongia uthmoelleri  – Hanang hornless chameleon
Kinyongia vanheygeni  – Van Heygen's chameleon
Kinyongia vosseleri  – East Usambara two-horned chameleon
Kinyongia xenorhina  – strange-nosed chameleon

Nota bene: A binomial authority in parentheses indicates that the species was originally described in a genus other than Kinyongia.

References

Further reading
 (2009). "Kinyongia asheorum sp. n., a new montane chameleon from the Nyiro Range, northern Kenya (Squamata: Chamaeleonidae)". Zootaxa 2028: 41–50.
 (2006). "A review of the genus Bradypodion (Sauria: Chamaeleonidae), with the descriptions of two new genera". Zootaxa 1363: 23–38. (Kinyongia, new genus).

 
Lizard genera
Taxa named by Colin R. Tilbury
Taxa named by Krystal A. Tolley
Taxa named by William Roy Branch